Athanasius III served as Greek Patriarch of Alexandria between 1276 and 1316.

Relations with the Church of Rome
Since the Bishop of Rome appointed a titular Latin Patriarch of Alexandria in 1310, it is likely that ecclesiastical communion had been broken by Athanasius III episcopate.

References
Notes

Sources

13th-century Patriarchs of Alexandria
14th-century Patriarchs of Alexandria